Marly Rivera is a sportswriter and reporter who currently works for ESPN and ESPN Deportes, and is also a contributor to ESPN Radio and ESPN Deportes Radio.

Career
Rivera was a general assignment sportswriter and reporter at ESPN Deportes Digital before being named a New York Yankees beat writer. She is the second woman of color to have covered the Yankees as a beat, following in the footsteps of her mentor, Claire Smith.

Prior to working at ESPN, Rivera was an editorial producer and writer at Major League Baseball Advanced Media and a reporter and editor at Univision Communications. She is currently the only Latina national baseball writer and commentator for ESPN and ESPN Deportes and the only woman to have been a color commentator for ESPN Deportes Radio for MLB's All Star Game, postseason, and World Series broadcasts.

Rivera has been a guest contributor on Béisbol Esta Noche and Sunday Night Baseball in Spanish and English, in addition to Outside the Lines. She is also a frequent contributor to ESPN's flagship program, SportsCenter, and was a guest panelist on the July 21–22, 2016 edition of ESPN First Take. She was the host of the Max y Marly podcast alongside SportsCenter anchor Max Bretos. She was also the lead reporter on the ESPN initiative known as “Béisbol Experience”, the most extensive cross-platform project ever done by the network on Latino MLB players living in the United States.

Rivera currently co-hosts the debate show Nación ESPN on ESPN2 alongside NBA Analyst and ESPN Los Angeles Radio host Jorge Sedano.

On October 13, 2017, Rivera was named one of “The 30 Most Influential Hispanics in Sports” by Sports Illustrated.

Personal life
Rivera is bilingual. She was born and raised in San Juan, Puerto Rico, but moved to mainland United States as a teenager. Her parents, Ray and Elba, are from the small town of Coamo.

Rivera has done philanthropic work to support her island of Puerto Rico after the impact of Hurricane Maria on September 20, 2017.

References

Year of birth missing (living people)
Living people
American sportswriters
Major League Baseball broadcasters
People from San Juan, Puerto Rico
Women sportswriters
American women sportswriters